Bardiyeh may refer to:
 Bardiyeh-ye Yek
 Bardiyeh-ye Kuchek